Jamaica Olympic Association (IOC code: JAM) is the National Olympic Committee representing Jamaica. It is also the body responsible for Jamaica's representation at the Olympic Games.

History
The Jamaica Olympic Association was founded in 1936 and recognised by the International Olympic Committee in the same year.

Member federations
The Jamaican National Federations are the organizations that coordinate all aspects of their individual sports. They are responsible for training, competition and development of their sports. There are currently 18 Olympic Summer and 2 Winter Sport Federations and 4 Non-Olympic Sport Federations in Jamaica. Note that the Jamaican Olympic Ice Hockey Federation is the only non-profit organization based outside of Jamaica.

Olympic Sport federations

Non-Olympic Sport federations

See also
Jamaica at the Olympics
Jamaica at the Commonwealth Games

References

External links
 Official website

1936 establishments in Jamaica
Jamaica
Jamaica at the Olympics
Jamaica
Olympic
Sports organizations established in 1936